Zainab Umair (Urdu: زینب عمیر) is a Pakistani politician and lawyer who had been a member of the Provincial Assembly of the Punjab from August 2018 till January 2023.

She is currently Spokesperson for Punjab Government. Also holds Membership of provincial Assembly of Punjab. Zainab is a practicing Advocate of Lahore High Court. She is Chairperson Standing Committee for Law and Member of Central Governing Body. Zainab is also a member of Insaf Lawyer Forum, Pakistan.

Political career 
She was elected to the Provincial Assembly of the Punjab as a candidate of Pakistan Tehreek-e-Insaf (PTI) on a reserved seat for women in 2018 Pakistani general election.

2011 to 2018 : Additional General Secretary, Pak Lawyers Forum Punjab

2013 : Member Election Commission (PTI Intra Party Election)

2006 to 2009: Member PTI Women Wing 

1997 to Present : Member PTI (1997 to date).

2013: Chief Polling Agent (PTI) in NA-125 in General Elections, 2013.

Filed Petition in Lahore High Court to release detenues during “call of lock down”.

Appeared as witness in rigging  case in NA-125 against PML (N) candidate.

Education 
Zainab completed her LLB from University of Punjab, Lahore in 1999. Her Bachelors was also from University of Punjab, Lahore in 1995. Zainab also holds IVLP Professional Course on Intellectual Property Rights Protection, 2010, from Graduate School, (State Department), USA.

Work
2002 to Present: Practicing Law as an Advocate of the Lahore High Court, Lahore.

Mar 2000 to Present: Practicing law as an Advocate in Lower Courts in the various fields of civil Litigation.

September 1999 to Present: Senior Associate, Cornelius, Lane & Mufti (a leading Law Firm based in Lahore, Pakistan with worldwide network).

Professional  & Academic Affiliations 
Life Member of Lahore High Court Bar Association

Life Member Lahore Bar Association

Member Punjab Bar Counsel

Member of Inter University Course Curriculum Committee (IUCCC), University of the Punjab, Lahore on the subject of Property Laws

2013 to 2014 : Secretary General, Pak US Alumni Network

2011 to 2012 : Co-Chairperson Lawyers Legal Education Seminar Committee

2010 to 2012 : Member Executive Legal, Pakistan US Alumni Network (PUAN) Punjab Section

2009 to 2010 : Member Executive Committee, Lahore High Court Bar Association

2006 to 2013 : Visiting Lecturer, Pakistan Law College, Lahore. (Property Laws, Intellectual Property Laws)

2001 to 2006 : Visiting Lecturer, Punjab Law College, Lahore. (Taught Property Laws, Arbitration Act & Principles of Equity)

Publications 
Article Published on "Protecting our children" in The News International on 5th Dec 2019.

Articles published in PLD on Patent Laws.

Article published in Legal Affairs on “Begging”  

Article published in Legal Affairs on “A letter by Justice Cornelius”.

Article published in Legal Affairs on “Women Empowerment”

References

Living people
Punjabi people
Punjab MPAs 2018–2023
Pakistan Tehreek-e-Insaf MPAs (Punjab)
Year of birth missing (living people)